Mulaqaat (English: 'Meeting') is a 2002 Indian Bollywood film directed by K. Ravi Shankar and produced by Shanoo Mehra. It stars Jackie Shroff and Madhoo in pivotal roles.

Cast
 Vinay Anand – Jas
 Shivani Rathod – Shabnam Khan
 Milind Gunaji – Akhtar Khan
 Jackie Shroff – Javed Khan
 Madhoo – Archana Vithalrao Patkar
 Arun Bakshi – Mr. Patkar
 Rita Bhaduri – Mrs. Patkar
 Kulbhushan Kharbanda – Siddiqui Khan

Music
"Ek Aisi Ghazal" - Pankaj Udhas
"Ishq Rab Ki Dua" - Rohan Kapoor
"Jaa Le Ja Mera Dil" - Alka Yagnik, Abhijeet
"Tum Mile To Nahi" - Alka Yagnik
"Whisky Risky" - Roop Kumar Rathod, Vinay Anand
"Yeh Mera Geet" - Suresh Wadkar

External links

2000s Hindi-language films
2002 films
Films scored by Bappi Lahiri
Films scored by Vishal Bhardwaj